UEFA U-19 Championship 2008 (Elite Round) is the second round of qualifications for the Final Tournament of UEFA U-19 Championship 2008. The winners of each group join hosts Czech Republic at the Final Tournament.

Group 1

Group 2

Group 3

Group 4

Group 5

Group 6

Group 7

See also
2008 UEFA European Under-19 Championship
2008 UEFA European Under-19 Championship qualification

Qualification Elite
UEFA European Under-19 Championship qualification